is a sub-kilometer asteroid, classified as a near-Earth object of the Apollo group, that is a temporary quasi-satellite of the Earth. There are over a dozen known Earth quasi-satellites, some of which switch periodically between the quasi-satellite and horseshoe co-orbital states.

Discovery 
 was discovered on 12 August 2020 by the Pan-STARRS 1 survey at the Haleakalā Observatory. It was later recovered by the Karl Schwarzschild Observatory in August 2021, which allowed for precovery in earlier Pan-STARRS observations from 24 July 2017.

Orbit and orbital evolution 
 is currently an Apollo asteroid (Earth-crossing but with a period longer than a year). Its semi-major axis (currently 1.001715 AU) is similar to that of Earth (0.999789 AU), but it has both low eccentricity (0.07384) and low orbital inclination (5.827°). It alternates between being an Aten asteroid and being an Apollo asteroid, although its orbital evolution is not fully stable and it can be considered as a temporary quasi-satellite of the Earth; its orbital evolution is akin to that of 469219 Kamo%CA%BBoalewa.

Physical properties 
With an absolute magnitude of 26.6, it has a diameter in the range 10–30 meters (for an assumed albedo range of 0.20–0.04 respectively).

See also 

 3753 Cruithne
 54509 YORP
 
 469219 Kamo%CA%BBoalewa

References

Further reading
 Understanding the Distribution of Near-Earth Asteroids Bottke, W. F., Jedicke, R., Morbidelli, A., Petit, J.-M., Gladman, B. 2000, Science, Vol. 288, Issue 5474, pp. 2190–2194.
 A Numerical Survey of Transient Co-orbitals of the Terrestrial Planets Christou, A. A. 2000, Icarus, Vol. 144, Issue 1, pp. 1–20.
 Debiased Orbital and Absolute Magnitude Distribution of the Near-Earth Objects Bottke, W. F., Morbidelli, A., Jedicke, R., Petit, J.-M., Levison, H. F., Michel, P., Metcalfe, T. S. 2002, Icarus, Vol. 156, Issue 2, pp. 399–433.
 Transient co-orbital asteroids Brasser, R., Innanen, K. A., Connors, M., Veillet, C., Wiegert, P., Mikkola, S., Chodas, P. W. 2004, Icarus, Vol. 171, Issue 1, pp. 102–109.
 A trio of horseshoes: past, present and future dynamical evolution of Earth co-orbital asteroids 2015 XX169, 2015 YA and 2015 YQ1 de la Fuente Marcos, C., de la Fuente Marcos, R. 2016, Astrophysics and Space Science, Vol. 361, Issue 4, article 121 (13 pp).

External links 
 Discovery MPEC 
  data at MPC
 
 
 

Minor planet object articles (unnumbered)
Earth-crossing asteroids

20200812